Devyatkino (until 1992 Komsomolskaya ) is a station of the Saint Petersburg Metro and St. Petersburg–Kuznechnoye railway. It is the only Metro station located outside the city limits, in Vsevolozhsky District of Leningrad Oblast.

It is the northern terminus of the Kirovsko–Vyborgskaya Line. The name of the station is derived from the name of nearby suburb. Like Rybatskoye, Kupchino and Parnas the station is located on the surface  and connected to an electrichka commuter train station by the same name. In this case, the southbound train tracks are on the left side of the station while the northbound tracks are on the right, allowing for easy transfers between the subway and the trains.

Devyatkino was opened on 29 December 1978 as the part of the last segment of the line.

Until 1982 it was the northernmost metro station in the world, which was surpassed by the Helsinki Metro.

Gallery

External links 
 Images of the station at Ometro.net (Russian)
 Images of the station at metro-spb.nwd.ru (Russian)
 Images of the station at Metrowalks.ru (Russian)
 statistics (English)
 panoramatic view (on the right)

Saint Petersburg Metro stations
Railway stations in Russia opened in 1978